The United States has a long history offering studies in international relations and public policy with many heads of state and heads of government graduating from American schools. Prominent alumni of school of international relations in the U.S. include Bill Clinton, former President of the United States; Gloria Macapagal Arroyo, former President of the Philippines; and Abdullah II ibn al-Hussein, the King of Jordan. Today, 18 out of the top 20 schools of international relations are based in the United States.

Schools

See also

 Association of Professional Schools of International Affairs
 Inside the Ivory Tower
 List of schools of international relations

Notes

References

International relations